Danville Township is a township in Vermilion County, Illinois, USA.  As of the 2010 census, its population was 32,113 and it contained 13,913 housing units.  Danville Area Community College and the Illinois Department Of Corrections Danville Correctional Facility are in this township.

History
Danville Township was one of the eight townships created in 1851.

Danville Township was named for Dan Beckwith, an Indian trader.

Geography

Cities and towns
 Belgium (north three-quarters)
 Danville (the county seat) (southern portion)
 Tilton
 Westville (north edge)

Unincorporated towns
 Batestown
 Hartshorn
 Hegeler
 Hillery

Extinct towns
 Beeler Terrace
 Brookville
 Grape Creek
 South Danville
 Vandercook
 Vermilion Heights
 Walz
 Wyton

Adjacent townships
 Newell Township (north)
 Highland Township, Vermillion County, Indiana (east)
 Mound Township, Warren County, Indiana (east)
 Georgetown Township (south)
 McKendree Township (south)
 Catlin Township (southwest)
 Oakwood Township (west)
 Blount Township (northwest)

Cemeteries
The township contains these cemeteries: Atherton, Danville National, Forse, Greenwood, Hooten, Langley, Lutheran, Lynch, Oakhill, Parish, Saint Patrick's and Sandhill.

Major highways
  Interstate 74
  U.S. Route 136
  U.S. Route 150
  Illinois State Route 1

Rivers
 Vermilion River

Airports and landing strips
 Danville Correctional Center Heliport
 Lakeview Medical Center Heliport

Demographics

School districts
 Catlin Community Unit School District 5
 Danville Community Consolidated School District 118
 Oakwood Community Unit School District 76
 Westville Community Unit School District 2

Political districts
 Illinois' 15th congressional district
 State House District 104
 State Senate District 52

References
 U.S. Board on Geographic Names (GNIS)
 United States Census Bureau 2007 TIGER/Line Shapefiles

External links
 US-Counties.com
 City-Data.com
 Illinois State Archives

Townships in Vermilion County, Illinois
Townships in Illinois